Liesvesi is a  medium-sized lake of Central Finland in the Kymijoki main catchment area. It is situated in the Konnevesi municipality. It belongs to the Konnevesi-Laukaa canoeing route.

See also
List of lakes in Finland

References
 Vanginvesi-Liesvesi in the Järviwiki Web Service 

Landforms of Central Finland
Lakes of Hankasalmi
Lakes of Konnevesi